Rowland Ellis (24 April 1841 – 11 December 1911) was a Welsh bishop who held the post of Bishop of Aberdeen and Orkney in the Scottish Episcopal Church from 1906 until his death.

Life
Ellis was born in Caerwys, Flintshire, and was educated at Ruthin School before graduating from Jesus College, Oxford, with a BA degree, in 1863.  After being ordained in 1864, he held various church positions in Wales: curate of Gresford (1864–68), vicar of Gwersyllt (1868–72) and vicar of Mold 1872–84 (also Rural Dean of Mold from 1873 to 1884).  He was a friend of William Ewart Gladstone, who lived nearby in Hawarden.  

He joined the Scottish Episcopal Church when he became rector of St Paul's Church in Edinburgh in 1884. He was synod clerk of Edinburgh, and canon of St. Mary's Cathedral, and he became Bishop of Aberdeen and Orkney in 1906. He was consecrated on 25 April of that year at St. Andrew's Church, Aberdeen.

He wrote a number of theological works, including Some aspects of woman's life: five lenten addresses (1881), and was regarded as a strong opponent of disestablishment of the Church in Wales.  He died in his sleep at Delgatie Castle, Turriff, Aberdeenshire, where he was staying as a guest of Charles Hay, 20th Earl of Erroll.

References

External links
 

Bishops of Aberdeen and Orkney
People from Caerwys
Welsh bishops
Alumni of Jesus College, Oxford
1841 births
1911 deaths
People educated at Ruthin School